Benjamin Alfred Davidson (1902–1961) was a New Zealand rugby league footballer who represented New Zealand.

His brother Bill also represented New Zealand and another brother, George, played for Auckland and competed in the 1920 Summer Olympics as a sprinter.

Playing career
Alongside his brothers, Davidson played for the City Rovers in the Auckland Rugby League competition. He played for Auckland City in 1923 against the touring Great Britain Lions.

He was selected for the New Zealand national rugby league team on their 1926-27 tour of Great Britain.

Along with Lou Brown and Len Mason, Davidson was signed by Wigan after the tour. Davidson played there for three seasons, scoring 31 tries in 69 games.

He then returned to Auckland. Davidson again made the Auckland side and in 1932 played for New Zealand against the Great Britain Lions. He finished his test career having played in four matches.

References

1902 births
1961 deaths
New Zealand rugby league players
New Zealand national rugby league team players
Auckland rugby league team players
City Rovers players
Wigan Warriors players
North Island rugby league team players
Rugby league wingers
Rugby league centres
Place of birth missing
Date of birth missing